Mohamed Amelhaf (born 25 November 1997) is a French footballer who plays as a forward for IC Croix.

Career
Amelhaf made his professional debut for VfR Aalen in the 3. Liga on 13 March 2019, coming on as a substitute in the 68th minute for Johannes Bühler in the 3–0 away win against Karlsruher SC. On 6th August 2020 Amelhaf signed for 1. FC Bruchsal.

References

External links
 
 
 

1997 births
Living people
French footballers
French expatriate footballers
French expatriate sportspeople in Belgium
Expatriate footballers in Belgium
French expatriate sportspeople in Germany
Expatriate footballers in Germany
Association football forwards
K.V. Kortrijk players
VfR Aalen players
1. FC Bruchsal players
Iris Club de Croix players
3. Liga players